Cikarang is a town serving the seat of Bekasi Regency, West Java, Indonesia. The biggest industrial estate in Southeast Asia, Kota Jababeka is located there.

Industrial area

Cikarang is an area located in Kota Deltamas that includes the government of Bekasi Regency. Cikarang has contributed to the spread of industrialization from the West Cikarang (Cibitung) area to South Cikarang. The city is known for MM2100 Cikarang Barat, Kota Jababeka, Bekasi International Industrial Estate (BIIE), or the Hyundai Industrial Park; East Jakarta Industrial Park (EJIP), Delta Silicon Industrial Park, and Indonesia-China Integrated Industrial Zone (Kawasan Industri Terpadu Indonesia-China, KITIC). Many foreign companies are located in Cikarang industrial estate.

Cikarang's Industrial City is supported by housing complexes scattered around the Cikarang industrial park that was built by a collection of architects and contractors under PT PP. This residential area stretches around Tambun, Cibitung, Cikarang, Serang, Setu, Ci Cau, and Cibarubsah. Some residential areas are well known, such as Jababeka and Lippo Cikarang. Cikarang has attracted industries including tourism, household, food and television.

Cikarang Dry Port is located in Jababeka Industrial Estate, the biggest manufacturing zone of West Java. Indonesia is home to a dozen industrial estates with more than 2,500 companies, both multinational and small-medium enterprises (SMEs). Approximately  are allocated for the Dry Port, which is accessible by highway and rail.

Cikarang wet Port offers cargo handling and logistics for export and import, as well as domestic distribution. It provides integrated port and logistics services with dozens of logistics and supply chain players, such as export/import, carriers, terminal operators, container freight stations, bonded warehouses, transportation, third party logistics (3PL), and empty container depots, as well as banks and other supporting facilities. The Dry Port is the extension gate of Tanjung Priok International Port. Document formalities for port clearance and customs clearance are completed in the Cikarang Dry Port.

Cikarang Dry Port has been appointed as an Integrated Customs Services Zone with a new international port code, IDJBK. The shipping lines’ service connects Cikarang Dry Port with other ports as part of international trading lines.

Climate
Cikarang has a tropical monsoon climate (Am) with moderate rainfall from May to October and heavy rainfall from November to April.

Transport
Cikarang railway station is served by KRL Commuter Line to Jakarta Kota railway station and regional train services such as Jatiluhur (runs between Cikarang and ) and Walahar Express (Cikarang to ). Lemahabang railway station, also located in Cikarang, is only served by Jatiluhur and Walahar Express trains.

Sports
Wibawa Mukti Stadium was used as a venue for men's football at the 2018 Asian Games.

See also
 Lippo Cikarang, an independent township developed by Lippo Group
 Central Cikarang, a district which is part of Cikarang

References

Populated places in West Java
Regency seats of West Java